Moacșa is a commune in Covasna County, Transylvania, Romania composed of two villages:
Moacșa / Maksa
Pădureni / Sepsibesenyő

History 

It formed part of the Székely Land region of the historical Transylvania province. Until 1918, the village belonged to the Háromszék County of the Kingdom of Hungary. After the Treaty of Trianon of 1920, it became part of Romania. In 2004, Dalnic broke off from Moacșa to form an independent commune.

Demographics

The commune has an absolute Székely Hungarian majority. According to the 2011 census, it has a population of 1,206, of which 94.69% or 1,142 are Hungarian.

References

Communes in Covasna County
Localities in Transylvania